The Maharashtra State Road Transport Corporation abbreviated as (MSRTC, or simply ST), is the state run bus service of Maharashtra, India which serves routes to towns and cities within Maharashtra as well as to its adjoining states. It has a fleet strength of 18,449 buses. It also offers a facility for online booking of tickets for all buses. Recently From 21 May 2020, the Corporation Started Goods Transportation, Private Bus Body Building, Private Vehicle Tyre Remoulding. In future, Corporation plans to start petrol pump for private vehicles all over the Maharashtra.

official website- https://msrtc.maharashtra.gov.in/

Ticket/ Reservation -https://public.msrtcors.com/ticket_booking/index.php

History 
The Maharashtra State Road Transport Corporation was established by the State Government of Maharashtra as per the provision in Section 3 of RTC Act 1950. The MSRTC operates its services by the approved scheme of road transport published vide Notification MVA 3173/30303-XIIA dated 29 November 1973 in the official gazette. The area covered by the scheme is the entire area of the state of Maharashtra. The undertaking is operating stage and contract carriage services in the entire area of the state of Maharashtra except S.T. undertaking defined under Section 68 A (b) of M. V. Act and other exceptions published in the scheme. The first bus was flagged off from Pune to Ahmednagar in 1948.

Tracing the history that saw this development, we go back to the 1920s; when various entrepreneurs started operations in the public transport sector. Till the Motor Vehicle Act came into being in 1939, there were no regulations monitoring their activities which resulted in arbitrary competition and unregulated fares. The implementation of the Act rectified matters to some extent. The individual operators were asked to form a union on defined routes in a particular area. This also proved to be beneficial for travelers as some sort of schedule set in; with a time table, designated pick-up points, conductors, and fixed ticket prices. This was the state of affairs till 1948, when the then Bombay State Government, with the late Morarji Desai as the home minister, started its own state road transport service, called State Transport Bombay. And, with this, the first blue and silver-topped bus took off from Pune to Ahmednagar.

There were 10 makes of buses in use then – Chevrolet, Ford Motor Company, Bedford Vehicles, Seddon Atkinson, Studebaker, Morris Commercial, Albion Motors, Ashok Leyland, Commer and Fiat. In the early 1950s, two luxury coaches were also introduced with Morris Commercial Chassis. These were called Neelkamal and Giriyarohini and used to ply on the Pune-Mahabaleshwar route. They had two by two seats, curtains, interior decoration, a clock, and green tinted windows.

In 1950, a Road Transport Corporation Act was passed by the Central Government which delegated powers to states to form their individual road transport corporations with the Central Government contributing one-third of the capital. The Bombay State Road Transport Corporation (BSRTC) thus came into being, later changing its name to MSRTC with the re-organization of the state.

The ST started with 30 Bedford buses having wooden bodies, coir seats. The fare charged on the Pune-Nagar route was nine paisa. With time, the S.T. buses underwent many changes, including increasing the seating capacity from the original 30 to 45 to the present 54, introduction of all-steel bodies to replace wooden bodies to make them stronger and cushion seats for more comfort. Later, in 1960, aluminium bodies were introduced as steel corrodes, especially in coastal areas, and the colour code also changed to red from the blue and silver. A partial night service was launched in 1968; the overnight service about a decade later and the semi-luxury class came into being during the 1982 Asian Games.

The S.T. buses are also used for transportation of the postal mail, distribution of medicines, newspapers and even tiffins sent by people from rural areas to their relatives in cities. They also are used to transport agricultural goods to cities.

Fleet 

MSRTC is operating a fleet of approximately 15,512 buses that ferry 8.7 million passengers daily.

The Ordinary, Parivartan, Asiad and City Buses are built at MSRTC's in-house workshops at Pune city, Aurangabad, and Nagpur on Ashok Leyland and TATA chassis. These workshops produce as many as 20,000 buses per year on average. The corporation has nine tyre retreading plants along with 32 divisional workshops. The Shivneri air conditioned bus service consists of Volvo 9400R and Scania Metrolink buses. The Shivshahi buses are air-conditioned luxury buses which are operated by MSRTC and some private contractors.

In 2018, MSRTC added approximately a 1,000 special non-AC Vithai buses, which were introduced to ferry passengers to the pilgrim town of Pandharpur in Solapur district. They have a seating capacity of 45 seats and a similar design to that of 'Parivartan' buses.

In 2019,the MSRTC introduced new non-air conditioned buses with beds and recliner chairs specially designed for long overnight routes. Extra facilities like reading lamp, night lamp, charging point, fan and two huge storage compartments have also been provided.

MSRTC’s first electric bus 'Shivai' that plies from Pune to Ahmednagar was flagged from Pune in presence of the then Deputy Chief Minister Ajit Pawar and the then state Transport Minister Anil Parab on 1 June 2022. MSRTC would get 50 electric buses in July 2022 which will be deployed from Pune to four cities — Nashik, Solapur, Kolhapur and Aurangabad.

List of Bus Depots, Bus Stands & Traffic Controll Cells

2021-22 strike 
During the COVID-19 lockdown in India which started in March 2020, MSTRC was unable to process salaries of employees for many months. Salaries of nearly 90,000 employees were held up for 3-4 months, leading to few employees committing suicides finding it difficult to meet their needs. Employees put in various demands in front of the then Maharashtra government; like pay hike, remunerations for losses and also to consider merger of MSTRC with state government by which benefits of state government would get extended to the employees of MSTRC. With failure to reach any conclusion on demands; over 92,600 employees of MSTRC went on strike from 27 October 2021.

Gallery

References

External links 

Official website of MSRTC
MSRTC

State agencies of Maharashtra
Road transport in Maharashtra
Bus companies of India
State road transport corporations of India
Companies based in Mumbai
1948 establishments in Bombay State
1960 establishments in Maharashtra
Transport companies established in 1948